Aravan may refer to:

Aravan, Kyrgyzstan, a large village in Osh Region, Kyrgyzstan
Aravan District, a district of Osh Region, Kyrgyzstan
Aravan or Aravansay, a river in Kyrgyzstan and Uzbekistan
Aravan (legendary), a legendary ruler of 5th century BC Armenia
Iravan, a character from the Hindu epic Mahabharata